= OSMET =

Overseas Sri Lankan Muslim Educational Trust (OSMET) is an educational charity inaugurated in 1981 to provide higher education scholarships to under-privileged Sri Lankan Muslims in the fields of science, IT, engineering and medicine. To date, OSMET has been able to assist over 600 students.

OSMET is a UK registered charity and is registered in Sri Lanka as a recognised charity. Presently, 95 students are following courses in schools and universities in Sri Lanka, 28 students have completed university degrees, and 20 students have completed GCE Advanced levels with the help of OSMET grants.
